The 4th Mountain Division was established in October 1940. It took part in the 1941 Balkans Campaign and then joined Army Group South in Operation Barbarossa after it was already underway. In 1942 it participated in the failed attempt to seize the Caucasus in Operation Edelweiss under Army Group A. Following the operation's failure, the division was pushed back into the Kuban bridgehead, then the Crimean Peninsula, western Ukraine, Hungary, and Slovakia. The division surrendered to the Soviet forces near Czech city of Olomouc when the war ended in May 1945.

During the war, 33 members of the division received the Iron Cross Knight's Cross and two received the Knight's Cross with Oak Leaves.

Commanders 
Generalleutnant Karl Eglseer, 23 October 1940 – 1 October 1941
Oberst Karl Wintergerst, 1 October 1941 – November 1941
Generalleutnant Karl Eglseer, November 1941 – 22 October 1942
Generalleutnant Hermann Kreß, 23 October 1942 – 11 August 1943(Kreß was killed by a Soviet sniper on 11 August 1943, near Novorossiysk on the Kuban bridgehead)
Generalleutnant Julius Braun, 13 August 1943 – 6 June 1944
Oberst Karl Jank, 6 June 1944 – 1 July 1944
Generalleutnant Friedrich Breith, 1 July 1944 – 23 February 1945
Oberst Robert Bader, 23 February 1945 – 6 April 1945
Generalleutnant Friedrich Breith, 6 April 1945 – 8 May 1945

Order of battle
Gebirgsjäger-Regiment 13
Gebirgsjäger-Regiment 91
Gebirgs-Artillerie-Regiment 94
Panzerjäger-Kompanie 94
Gebirgs-Pionier-Bataillon 94
Aufklärungsabteilung 94
Nachrichten-Abteilung 94
Gebirgsjäger-Bataillon 94
Divisions-Einheiten 94

References

4
Military units and formations established in 1940
Military units and formations disestablished in 1945